Adana Yeşiloba Hippodrome is a horse racing track located at the Yeşiloba neighborhood of the Seyhan district of the city Adana.

History
Horse racing started in Adana in 1962 at a race course near the Şakirpaşa Airport. Shortly afterwards after the race course moved to its current location to a  land area. At the opening, there was only the sand track which still serves today. The turf track was completed in 1996 and started hosting competitions in the spring of 1998. Besides the two tracks, training track was opened in fall 2000. There are currently 3 tracks at the race course.

The second spectator stands, which has a 3000-seat capacity, was opened in January 1999.

Physical attributes
The race course covers an area of  consisting of facilities for racing, training and barns. The race course has three interleaved tracks as:

There are two spectator stands, newer one being a 3-storey, 3000-seat modern structure. Within the complex there are also five restaurants, food vendors, a playground for children and a haflinger paddock. An area of more than 1 hectare is set as a recreational area for visitors.

There are five pony barns at the race course, also an oat storage and a horseshoer. At the pension area, there are 1260 barns and a modern horse hospital that accommodates a surgery unit. Also at this area there is a shopping and services area.

Transportation
Yeşiloba Hippodrome can be accessed by Barkal minibuses from downtown of Adana, and by TOK and Koç minibuses from Tarsus and Mersin. 

Şehitlik railway station, 1.6 km east of the hippodrome, is served by frequent trains from Adana Central, Şakirpaşa, Yenice, Tarsus and Mersin Central stations.

References

Sport venues in Adana
Horse racing venues in Turkey
Sports venues completed in 1962